Sanguinet & Staats was an architectural firm based in Fort Worth, Texas, with as many as five branch offices in Texas. The firm specialized in steel-frame construction and built many skyscrapers in Texas. The firm also accepted commissions for residential buildings, and 
designed many buildings listed on the National Register of Historic Places.

History of the Partnerships
Sanguinet & Staats was an architecture firm formed in 1903 by Marshall R. Sanguinet, who had practiced in Fort Worth since 1883, and Carl G. Staats, a draftsman who had worked for James Riely Gordon.  The firm established its original office in Fort Worth and later expanded with offices in five Texas cities: Dallas, Houston, San Antonio, Waco, and Wichita Falls. Sanguinet & Staats also took on various partners over time. In 1903, the Dallas office sprung from a new partnership called Sanguinet, Staats and Hill, which operated for two years under that name until Charles D. Hill left the firm. In 1922, architect Wyatt C. Hedrick joined and it became Sanguinet, Staats, and Hedrick. In turn, this firm added R.D. Gottlieb as a limited partner for just the Houston office, forming Sanguinet, Staats, Hedrick, and Gottlieb. Sanguinet and Staats retired in 1926 after selling their shares to Hedrick. From 1923 to 1934, Preston M. Geren Sr. worked for the firm as chief engineer before starting his own Fort Worth firm.

Works
Although Sanguinet and Staats designed various kinds of buildings, the firm's main business was the design and construction of tall, street-framed office buildings.

Works (and credits) include:
Agricultural Pavilion, 1925, with architects Wyatt C. Hedrick; Sanguinet, Staats, and Hedrick; William Ward Watkin.
ALICO Building, built in 1910 by the architectural firm Sanguinet & Staats with associate architect Roy Lane, for the Amicable Life Insurance
Neil P. Anderson Building, 411 W. 7th St. 	Fort Worth, Texas (Sanguinett & Staats) NRHP-listed
Stephen F. Austin Elementary School, 319 Lipscomb St., Fort Worth, Texas (Messer,Sanguinet & Messer) NRHP-listed
James L. Autry House, 5 Courtlandt Pl., Houston, Texas (Sanguinet & Staats) NRHP-listed
William J. Bryce House, 4900 Bryce Ave., Fort Worth, Texas (Sanguinet,Marshall) NRHP-listed
Burk Burnett Building, 500—502 Main St., Fort Worth, Texas (Sanguinet & Staats) NRHP-listed
Carter Building, 806 Main St., Houston, Texas (Sanguinet & Staats)
A. S. Cleveland House, 8 Courtlandt Pl., Houston, Texas (Sanguinet & Staats) NRHP-listed
John M. Dorrance House, 9 Courtlandt Pl., Houston, Texas (Sanguinet,Staats & Barnes) NRHP-listed
Eighth Avenue Historic District, Bounded by 8th Ave., Pennsylvania Ave., 9th Ave., and Pruitt St., Fort Worth, Texas (Sanguinet & Staats) NRHP-listed
Flatiron Building, 1000 Houston St., Fort Worth, Texas (Sanguinet & Staats) NRHP-listed
Franklin Lofts, designed by architect Sanguinet and Staats
Great Jones Building, with which Sanguinet & Staats is believed to be associated
Hot Springs High School (Arkansas), Oak St. between Orange and Olive Sts., Hot Springs, AR Late Gothic Revival architecture (Sanguinet & Staats) NRHP-listed
Hotel Texas, 815 Main St., Fort Worth, Texas (Sanguinet & Staats) NRHP-listed
Knights of Pythias Building (Fort Worth, Texas), 315 Main St., Fort Worth, Texas restored 1981, designed by architect Sanguinet & Staats, 1901; renovated Thomas E. Woodward & Associates, 1988 NRHP-listed
Link-Lee House, 3800 Montrose, Houston, Texas (Sanguinet & Staats) NRHP-listed
C. L. Neuhaus House, 6 Courtlandt Pl., Houston, Texas (Sanguinet,Staats & Barnes) NRHP-listed
North Fort Worth High School, 600 Park St., Fort Worth, Texas (Sanguinet and Staats) NRHP-listed
Our Lady of Victory Academy, 801 W. Shaw St., Fort Worth, Texas (Sanguinet and Staats) NRHP-listed
Palestine High School (now the Museum for East Texas Culture), 400 Micheaux Ave., Palestine, Texas (Sanguinet & Staats) NRHP-listed
Paul Building, 1018 Preston Ave., Houston, Texas (Sanguinet & Staats) NRHP-listed
Sam Houston Hotel, 1117 Prairie St., Houston, Texas (Sanguinet, Staats, Hedrick & Gottlie) NRHP-listed
San Jacinto Building, designed by the firm Sanguinet, Staats, and Gottlieb.
Marshall R. Sanguinet House, 4729 Collinwood Ave., Fort Worth, Texas (Sanguinet, Marshall R.) NRHP-listed
Scarbrough Building, 500 block, Congress Ave., Austin, Texas (Sanguinet & Staats)
South Main Baptist Church, designed in 1924 by Sanguinet, Staats, Hedrick and Gottlieb
St. Andrew's Episcopal Church, Texas, build 1909–1912, designed by Sanguinet & Staats
St. Mary of the Assumption Church, Texas, built 1923, designed by architect Sanguinet, Staats & Hedrick, architecture Romanesque, Romanesque Revival. NRHP-listed
Sterling Myer House, 4 Courtlandt Pl., Houston, Texas (Sanguinet & Staats) NRHP-listed
Texas Technological College Dairy Barn, Texas Tech University campus, Lubbock, Texas (Sanguinet, Staats & Hedrick) NRHP-listed
W. T. Waggoner Building, 810 Houston St., Fort Worth, TX (Sanguinet & Staats) NRHP-listed
Wharton-Scott House, 1509 Pennsylvania Ave., Fort Worth, TX (Sanguinet & Staats) NRHP-listed
Wilson Building, 1621-1623 Main St., Dallas, TX (Sanguinet & Staats) NRHP-listed

References

Defunct architecture firms based in Texas
Design companies established in 1903
1903 establishments in Texas